Project Blue Fly is a former covert project of the United States Air Force during the Cold War that existed at the Air Force Missile Development Center at Holloman Air Force Base. The aim of the project was to exploit the discovery  of Soviet hardware when it landed in American or allied hands permanently.

See also
Project Moon Dust
Project Round Robin

References

External links
Temporary Duty Orders for the Missile Development Center

Projects of the United States Air Force